Tirathaba mundella, the oil palm bunch moth, is a species of snout moth. It is found in Malaysia.

The larvae feed on Areca catechu, Elaeis guineensis, Mangifera indica and Nephelium lappaceum. They bore into unopened spathes and feed on the tender floral parts. They may also attack tender nuts.

References

Moths described in 1864
Tirathabini
Pests of oil palm
Moths of Japan